Jessé Garon (born 1 August 1962 in La Rochelle, France) is a French artist, composer, singer-songwriter, and multi-instrumentalist of blues, country, rock'n'roll.

Career

He became known in 1983 with songs including "C'est Lundi" (1st prize Interpress of French Song, 1984), "Lucky Dom Dom", "Nous Deux "("With You" in English ; clip n° 1 in New York and Tokyo in summer 1985), "Le Prince du Rock'n'roll" (1986), "Elle n'a pas dit Oui" (1993), "Je Suis un Bohème" (2004) and others.

He is a student of the Bible of the High Medieval [EPHE-Sorbonne, 1993–2003] and has a degree in medicinal science, with a specialization  in naturopathy [AMCC of Montreal, in February 2002 to 20 March 2006]. 
From 2003 to 2004 he was scientific director for Publishing Harnois.

Discography

 Jesse Garon et l'âge d'or (Polydor 1984)
 Hommage (Polydor 1985)
 Prince du Rock 'n' Roll (Polydor 1986)
 Être Jeune (Polydor 1988)
 Complèt'ment Chiffré (A/B 1993)
 Best Of Jessé Garon''' (Choice Of Music 2002)
 Je Crois En La Vie (Sony Music – FGL 2004)
 D'un Commun Accord (Sony Music 2006)
 Le Coffret : Jessé Garon’ – L'essentiel du Prince du Rock 'n' Roll  (FGL 2010)
 Jessé Garon’ Live : Rock’n’roll aux Issambres (Naïve 2012)

 DVD 
 Jessé Garon’ Hillbilly French Cat (FCLP – 2005)
 Big Beat Story Volume 2 (BBR – 2011 – participatif)

 Filmography 
 A nous les garçons (Michel Lang – 1985)
 La nuit du clown (François Chayé – 1994)

 Some french articles in Historical Sciences 

  Introduction to Medieval Bible  (Harnois éd. 03.2001, p. 50–51)
  The Bible of Alcuin  (Harnois éd. 05.2001, p. 50–53)
  Medieval Paleography  (Harnois éd. 07.2001, p. 6–9)
  The Ancient Monarchies  (Harnois éd. 11.2002, p. 22–31)
  Introduction to the life of Prophet Mohamed  (Harnois éd. 10.2003, p. 28.31)
  The Veterans poliorcetics Hebrews  (Harnois éd. 12.2003, p. 58–61)
  The Book of the Dead Ancient Egyptians  (Harnois éd. 12.2003, p. 62–71)
  The Tibetan Book of the Dead (Harnois éd. 02.2004, p.18-21)
  The Bible of Saint Thomas Aquinas  (Harnois éd. 03.2004, p. 64–70)

Notes and references 

1962 births
Living people
French singer-songwriters